The  is a Japanese third-sector railway operating company established in 1996 to operate passenger railway services on the section of the JR East Shinetsu Main Line within Nagano Prefecture when it is separated from the JR East network in October 1997, coinciding with the opening of the Nagano Shinkansen (Hokuriku Shinkansen) from  to . The company was founded on May 1, 1996, and has its headquarters in Ueda, Nagano.

Shareholders
Shares in the company are owned by Nagano Prefecture, the cities of Nagano, Ueda, Komoro, Chikuma, Saku and Tōmi, the towns of Karuizawa, Miyota, Sakaki, Shinano, and Iizuna and private-sector businesses.

Lines
 Shinano Railway Line (65.1 km,  - )
 Shinano Railway Kita-Shinano Line (37.3 km,  - )

This section is called the Shinano Railway Line.

This section is called the Kita-Shinano Line.

History
The company was founded on May 1, 1996, and started railway business on the Shinano Railway Line on October 1, 1997.

See also
List of railway companies in Japan

References

External links
  

Railway companies of Japan
Companies based in Nagano Prefecture
Railway companies established in 1996
Japanese companies established in 1996
Japanese third-sector railway lines